Oleksiy Mykolaiovych "Alexei" Zhitnik (born October 10, 1972) is a Ukrainian-Russian former professional ice hockey defenceman. Zhitnik has played more games in the National Hockey League (NHL) (1,085) than any other Soviet-born defenceman. He has represented the Soviet Union, CIS, and Russia internationally, and Ukraine during two NHL All-Star Games. His number, 13, has been honored by Sokil Kyiv.

Playing career
Zhitnik was drafted 81st overall by the Los Angeles Kings in the 1991 NHL Entry Draft after playing for Sokil Kyiv in the Soviet Championship League for two years. After another year, he came to the NHL for the 1992–93 NHL season.

Zhitnik made his NHL debut on October 6, 1992, against the Calgary Flames and scored his first goal nine nights later, also against Calgary. In his rookie season with the Kings, he finished second among rookie defenceman in points with 48. He was an important part of the Kings' playoff run to the Stanley Cup Final, where they lost to the Montreal Canadiens.

After another year of playing with the Kings and Wayne Gretzky, Zhitnik was traded on February 14, 1995, along with Robb Stauber, Charlie Huddy and a fifth-round draft pick, to the Buffalo Sabres for Grant Fuhr, Denis Tsygurov and Philippe Boucher. He became one of the team's best players, helping the Sabres win the Northeast Division in the 1996–97 NHL season, his second full year with the team. In the 1997–98 NHL season, he led all defensemen in shorthanded goals (3). He also helped the Sabres reach the finals in the 1998–99 NHL season and stayed on the team until the 2004–05 NHL lockout when he returned to the Russian Super League.

Alexei Zhitnik had the assist on Wayne Gretzky's 1000th goal. 

Following the lockout, Zhitnik signed a four-year contract with the New York Islanders. He became an effective force on the team, and even though he missed the last 18 games of the season with a fractured ankle, he finished second among team defenceman in scoring.

On December 16, 2006, Zhitnik was traded to the Philadelphia Flyers for Freddy Meyer and a conditional third-round draft pick.  However, he was traded two months later on February 24, 2007, to the Atlanta Thrashers to add experience for playoffs, in exchange for Braydon Coburn.

Due to Zhitnik's disappointing play and the Thrashers focus on rebuilding, the team bought out Zhitnik's contract on June 30, 2008, making him a free agent. On July 26, 2008, Zhitnik returned to Russia and the now-Kontinental Hockey League, signing a tryout contract with Dynamo Moscow.

He played for Ukraine at the Maccabi “Jewish Olympics” in 2013 and 2017. Zhitnik also won a gold medal as part of Team Ukraine's Masters hockey team at the 2017 Maccabiah Games.

Awards
1992: Gold Medal (XVII Olympic Winter Games)
1996: Bronze Medal (World Cup of Hockey)
1998: Silver Medal (XVIII Olympic Winter Games)
1998–99: Played in the All-Star Game (NHL)
2001–02: Played in the All-Star Game (NHL)
2008: Spengler Cup Champion (Dynamo Moscow)
2008–09: Played in the All-Star Game (KHL)

Records
On February 20, 2007, as a Flyer, Zhitnik became the eighth defenseman born outside of North America, and first born in the Soviet Union to appear in 1,000 NHL games (Sergei Zubov has since joined Zhitnik in that regard). The others at the time were Nicklas Lidström, Börje Salming, Calle Johansson, Ulf Samuelsson, Fredrik Olausson (all from Sweden), Petr Svoboda from the Czech Republic and Teppo Numminen of Finland.

Career statistics

Regular season and playoffs

International

Career transactions
 Selected by Los Angeles Kings in 1991 NHL Entry Draft. He was Los Angeles' 4th round choice, 81st overall.
 Traded to Buffalo by Los Angeles Kings with Robb Stauber, Charlie Huddy and Los Angeles' 5th round choice (Marian Menhart) in 1995 Entry Draft for Philippe Boucher, Denis Tsygurov and Grant Fuhr, February 14, 1995.
 Signed as a free agent by Kazan (Russia), December 6, 2004.
 Signed as a free agent by the New York Islanders, August 2, 2005.
 Traded to Philadelphia by the Islanders for Freddy Meyer and a conditional 3rd round draft pick on December 16, 2006.
 Traded to Atlanta by Philadelphia for defenseman Braydon Coburn on February 24, 2007

See also
List of NHL players with 1000 games played

References

External links
 

1972 births
Living people
Ak Bars Kazan players
Atlanta Thrashers players
Buffalo Sabres players
HC CSKA Moscow players
HC Dynamo Moscow players
Ice hockey players at the 1992 Winter Olympics
Ice hockey players at the 1998 Winter Olympics
Los Angeles Kings draft picks
Los Angeles Kings players
Maccabiah Games gold medalists for Ukraine
Competitors at the 2017 Maccabiah Games
Medalists at the 1998 Winter Olympics
National Hockey League All-Stars
New York Islanders players
Olympic gold medalists for the Unified Team
Olympic ice hockey players of Russia
Olympic ice hockey players of the Unified Team
Olympic medalists in ice hockey
Olympic silver medalists for Russia
Philadelphia Flyers players
Russian ice hockey defencemen
Ukrainian expatriate sportspeople in Russia
Ukrainian expatriate sportspeople in the United States
Sokil Kyiv players
Soviet ice hockey defencemen
Sportspeople from Kyiv
Ukrainian ice hockey defencemen
Medalists at the 1992 Winter Olympics